Jean Bérenger (born October 2, 1934) is a French historian, director of research at the CNRS, professor at the Faculty of History of the University of Strasbourg and, starting from 1990, at the University of Paris-Sorbonne.

Bérenger specializes in the history of the countries of Central and Eastern Europe and in military history, mainly of the modern era, but has also published works on the contemporary era. His doctorate dealt with the history of Austria and Hungary in the 17th century.

Work
In 1974, he suggested other historians of the 17th century to "see, and study, minister-favorites not only in a national context but as a 'European phenomenon.'" His seminal 1974 Annales article on "royal favourites" has been credited as an important comparative study on the subject. He argued that the simultaneous success of several 17th-century minister-favorites in their respective countries was not coincidental, but reflected some change that took place in the period. J.H. Elliot and Lawrence Brockliss's work (that culminated in the collection of essays The World of the Favuorite), undertaken to explore the matter put forward by Bérenger, became the most important comparative treatment of this subject.

In 1975, he published what in the 2020s was still the only modern survey of the financial relationship between Government and Estates in the period between the Peace of Westphalia and the Treaty of Aix-la-Chapelle.

Incomplete list of works 
 Tolérance ou paix de religion en Europe centrale : 1415-1792, Honoré Champion, 2000 
 - Prix Monseigneur-Marcel 2001 of the Académie française
 L'Autriche-Hongrie, 1815-1918, Armand Colin, 1998 
 La révolution militaire en Europe (XVe-XVIIIe siècles), Economica, 1998 sous la direction de Jean Bérenger.
 Guerre et paix dans l'Europe du XVIIe siècle, Sedes, 1995, trois tomes. , 
 Histoire de l'Autriche, Presses universitaires de France, 1994  (collection Que sais-je ? n° 222)
 Histoire de l'empire des Habsbourg, 1273-1918, Fayard, 1990 
 Turenne, Fayard, 1987  - nombreuses rééditions - Une biographie de ce grand seigneur du XVIIe siècle qui s'inscrit dans le double registre de l'histoire militaire élargie à la géopolitique et de l'histoire sociale.
 La Tchécoslovaquie, Presses universitaires de France, 1978  (collection Que sais-je ? n° 1726)
 La République autrichienne de 1919 à nos jours, Klincksieck/Didier, 1971 
 Joseph d'Autriche : serviteur de l'État, Fayard, 2007 
‘Pour une enquête européenne, l’histoire du ministeriat au XVIIe siècle’, Annales Economies Sociétés Civilisations, 29, 1, février 1974, p. 166-192.

References

20th-century French historians
21st-century French historians
20th-century French people
21st-century French people
Historians of Europe
Living people
1934 births